Grayson is a city in Gwinnett County, Georgia, United States. The 2020 estimated population of Grayson, GA is 4740 people. The population was 2,666 at the 2010 census, up from 765 in 2000.

Geography
Grayson is located southeast of the center of Gwinnett County at  (33.893306, -83.955420). Georgia State Route 20 is the main highway through town, leading north  into Lawrenceville, the county seat, and southeast five miles to Loganville. Georgia State Route 84 (Grayson Parkway) leads southwest five miles to Snellville.

Grayson suffered a damaging tornado on June 27, 1994, killing a 10-year-old girl. The city has been benefitting from exurban growth in eastern Gwinnett County, especially in the late 1990s and through the 2000s.

Demographics

2020 census

As of the 2020 United States census, there were 4,730 people, 1,245 households, and 1,049 families residing in the city.

2010 census
, Grayson had a population of 2,666. The racial and ethnic composition of the population was 62.8% white, 23.8% black or African American, 0.4% Native American, 9.0% Asian, and 4% from other races. 4.8% of the population was Hispanic or Latino of any race.

2000 census
As of the census of 2000, there were 765 people, 276 households, and 226 families residing in the city. The racial makeup of the city was 94.77% White, 3.53% African American, 0.39% Asian, 0.65% Pacific Islander, 0.26% from other races, and 0.39% from two or more races. Hispanic or Latino of any race were 0.92% of the population.

There were 276 households, out of which 44.6% had children under the age of 18 living with them, 68.1% were married couples living together, 9.1% had a female householder with no husband present, and 17.8% were non-families. 15.2% of all households were made up of individuals, and 7.6% had someone living alone who was 65 years of age or older. The average household size was 2.77 and the average family size was 3.02.

In the city, the population was spread out, with 29.5% under the age of 18, 4.6% from 18 to 24, 34.0% from 25 to 44, 22.5% from 45 to 64, and 9.4% who were 65 years of age or older. The median age was 35 years. For every 100 females, there were 99.7 males. For every 100 females age 18 and over, there were 91.8 males.

The median income for a household in the city was $51,750, and the median income for a family was $61,618. Males had a median income of $37,500 versus $36,250 for females. The per capita income for the city was $22,695. About 6.3% of families and 8.2% of the population were below the poverty line, including 5.2% of those under age 18 and 13.6% of those age 65 or over.

Government

Local government 
The city government of Grayson consists of a mayor and four council members. 

The current mayor and council members are:
 Mayor: Allison Wilkerson
 Council members: Bob Foreman, Gene Ussery, James Gillespie, and Linda Jenkins.

Arts and culture
Modeled after Snellville Days in nearby Snellville, Grayson Day Festival, held annually on a Saturday at the end of April, features a parade down Main Street, food vendors, crafts, and live music. The city and local businesses sponsor the event, which takes place mostly in the centrally located Grayson City Park. The football team, marching band, and cheerleaders from Grayson High School, as well as other local organizations, politicians, and groups make the parade a favorite tradition among residents.

History
The city of Grayson was first called Trip. In 1901, John Ellery Jacobs, the postmaster and civic leader, wrote to the post office department requesting that Trip, Georgia be changed to Berkley, Georgia. On December 6, 1901, the General Assembly of Georgia approved an act to incorporate the town and change the name. Shortly after, Ellery Jacobs was notified that there was already a Berkley, Georgia. He then suggested Graymount (because there was a clear view of Stone Mountain), but it was also taken. He then suggested the name of Grayson, Georgia.

Education
The county operates Gwinnett County Public Schools.

Gwinnett County Public Library operates the Grayson Branch in Grayson.

Notable people 
 Joyce Chandler - Educator and politician. Member of Georgia House of Representatives. Resident of Grayson.
 Austin Meadows - Baseball player. Grew up in Grayson.
 Nikki Merritt - Politician. Member of the Georgia State Senate.Resident of Grayson.
 Chuck Robbins - Chairman and chief executive officer (CEO) of Cisco Systems. Born in Grayson.
 Robert Nkemdiche - NFL Football player. Grew up and started his carrier right in Grayson, at Grayson High School in 2015.

In popular culture
 Grayson was featured in Outbreak, authored by Robin Cook, which was published in 1987.

The 2020 movie called “The Stalker” was shot in Grayson

References

External links
City of Grayson official website

Cities in Georgia (U.S. state)
Cities in Gwinnett County, Georgia
Cities in the Atlanta metropolitan area
Populated places established in 1879